Scirpophaga praelata is a species of moth of the family Crambidae. It is found in most of Europe (except Ireland, Great Britain, Portugal, the Benelux, Germany, Fennoscandia, Estonia and Latvia), Russia, Turkey, Iran, Syria, Lebanon, North Africa, Japan, Taiwan, China and Australia.

The wingspan is 28–32 mm.

The larvae feed on Scirpus species, including Scirpus lacustris, Scirpus validus, Scirpus mucronatus and Scirpus littoralis.

References

Moths described in 1763
Schoenobiinae
Moths of Europe
Moths of Asia
Moths of Africa
Moths of Australia
Taxa named by Giovanni Antonio Scopoli